Radhika Sadanah better known by her stage name Roshini is a former Indian actress who has worked in the Telugu, Tamil, and Kannada film industries from 1997 to 1998. She is the sister of actress Jyothika and half-sister of Nagma.

Career
After getting a recommendation by Nagma, Roshini made her acting debut in Selva's comedy film Sishya, where she played the lead role alongside Karthik. She subsequently starred in Master (1997), opposite Chiranjeevi.

Roshini was keen to accept performance-orientated roles and turned down several offers in late 1997 to be a part of films in glamorous roles. She subsequently worked on K. Balachander's production Thulli Thirintha Kaalam (1998), opposite Arunkumar, after actress Manthra turned the film down. The film and her performance won mixed reviews and performed moderately at the box office. However, thereafter, her ongoing films such as Puli Pirandha Mann, opposite Napoleon, became stuck and she later quit the film industry.

Personal life
Roshini is the younger sister of actresses Nagma and Jyothika.

Filmography

References

Living people
Actresses in Tamil cinema
Actresses from Mumbai
20th-century Indian actresses
Indian film actresses
Actresses in Kannada cinema
Actresses in Telugu cinema
1979 births